Northern Exposure 2 is the third mix album by British DJ duo Sasha & John Digweed. Released on 14 July 1997, it is the second in their Northern Exposure series, preceded by Northern Exposure in 1996 and succeeded by Northern Exposure: Expeditions in 1999. In the United Kingdom, it was released by Ministry of Sound as a double CD package, whereas in the United States, it was on Ultra Records as two separate CDs — a "West Coast Edition" and an "East Coast Edition".

Like its critically acclaimed predecessor, Northern Exposure 2 is a concept album of specially selected tracks to set up two different "journeys", the first is around the East Coast and the second around the West Coast.

Track listing

Notes

Some tracks are incorrectly listed on the album release, see . These include tracks 03, 08, 10 and 11 (Disc 1); 01 and 08 (Disc 2)

Charts

References

External links
 

DJ mix albums
Sasha (DJ) albums
1997 compilation albums
Concept albums